Catene is a 1974 Italian melodrama film directed by Silvio Amadio. The film is the remake of the 1949 top grossing film with the same title by Raffaello Matarazzo.  It was a commercial failure, grossing about 60 million lire.

Cast
 Maurizio Merli as 	Alfio Capuano
 Rosemary Dexter as 	Francesca
 Mimmo Palmara as 	Giovanni
 Marco Liofredi	as Ricuccio
 José Greci
 Tuccio Musumeci

References

External links

1974 films
Italian drama films
Films directed by Silvio Amadio
Remakes of Italian films
Films scored by Roberto Pregadio
1970s Italian-language films
1970s Italian films